Robert Warner may refer to:

Politicians
Robert Warner (fl. 1390), MP for Marlborough
Robert Warner (MP) (1510–1575), MP Chippenham 1545, Wilton 1547, Downton March 1553 and Bossiney 1559

Others
Robert M. Warner (1927–2007), sixth archivist of the United States
Bob Warner (24), fictional character on the American television series 24
Bob Warner (ice hockey) (born 1950), former National Hockey League forward
Robert Warner (actor) (born 1937), Canadian actor in Corwin (TV series) etc.

See also
Rob Warner (disambiguation)